The 1991–92 NBA season was the 46th season of the National Basketball Association. The season ended with the Chicago Bulls winning their second straight NBA Championship, beating the Portland Trail Blazers 4 games to 2 in the NBA Finals. This would be Larry Bird's final season in the NBA.

Notable occurrences

The game clock and shot clock combo was introduced as of today.
Magic Johnson of the Los Angeles Lakers announces his retirement early in the season after receiving the news that he had tested positive for HIV.
The Philadelphia 76ers' Charles Barkley honored Johnson by switching from his usual number 34 to 32, which he wore for the entire season. The 76ers had retired the number in honor of Billy Cunningham, who un-retired it for Barkley to wear.
Due to back problems, Boston Celtics star Larry Bird retires at the end of the season, and since Bill Russell vs. Jerry West it brings one of the most memorable eras in NBA history (Magic vs. Bird) to a close.
After a season in the Western Conference's Midwest Division, the Orlando Magic move back to the Eastern Conference, playing in the Atlantic Division. The 27 teams of the NBA would remain in the same four divisions until 2004, when the league would realign into six divisions.
The 1992 NBA All-Star Game was played at the Orlando Arena in Orlando, Florida, with the West defeating the East 153–113. In an emotionally charged game, Magic Johnson wins the game's MVP award.
In the wake of the 1992 Los Angeles riots, the Los Angeles Lakers and Los Angeles Clippers rescheduled and relocated their home first-round playoff games. Game 4 of the Lakers-Blazers series was played at Thomas & Mack Center in Las Vegas, while Game 4 of the Clippers-Jazz series was played at the Anaheim Convention Center.
Luc Longley, drafted by the Timberwolves, becomes the first Australian to play in the NBA. He would later play in three Bulls championship teams.
Larry Brown became the first to coach two different NBA teams in a single season after resigning from the San Antonio Spurs to coach the Los Angeles Clippers. Brown led the Clippers to the team's first winning season since their relocation to Los Angeles in addition to ending their fifteen-year playoff drought.
The season marked the last time the Boston Celtics would win 50 games (they won 51) until the 2008 season. 
Following the first round loss to the New York Knicks, Detroit Pistons head coach Chuck Daly resigned, ending the Pistons' "Bad Boys" era.
On December 17, the Cleveland Cavaliers crushed the Miami Heat by a score of 148–80. This 68-point win by the Cavaliers stood as a record for nearly three decades until the Memphis Grizzlies defeated the Oklahoma City Thunder by 73 points 152–79 on December 2, 2021.
Run TMC, consisting of Golden State Warriors players Tim Hardaway, Chris Mullin and Mitch Richmond, was disbanded when Richmond was traded to the Sacramento Kings for Billy Owens.
The Utah Jazz played their first season at the Delta Center (now Vivint Arena).
The Phoenix Suns played their final season at the Arizona Veterans Memorial Coliseum.
The Chicago Bulls set a franchise record with 67 wins in a season (later broken by the 1996 team).
The NBA Finals and Stanley Cup Finals both had their games played in Chicago, causing a potential scheduling conflict with each other. However, this was rendered moot as the Blackhawks were swept in four games by the Pittsburgh Penguins, who ended up winning their second consecutive Stanley Cup.
Dennis Rodman recorded 1,530 rebounds and averaged 18.7 rebounds per game in the regular season, both of which were the highest figures since 1972. It is the first of an NBA record seven consecutive rebounding titles for Rodman.
Michael Jordan scored 35 points in the first half of Game 1 of the 1992 NBA Finals, setting records for most points in a Finals half and most three-pointers in a half (six) until the latter was broken by the Houston Rockets' Kenny Smith (seven) in 1995. He also set a new NBA record for the most times a player has won a championship and led the league in scoring in the same season.
The Miami Heat were the first of the four late 1980s expansion franchises to make it to the playoffs, but were swept in the first round by the Bulls.
All NBA teams sported patches on their warmups commemorating basketball's centennial anniversary.

1991–92 NBA changes
 The New Jersey Nets changed their road uniforms to a darker blue color.
 The Philadelphia 76ers changed their uniforms, adding stars to their jerseys.
 The Portland Trail Blazers changed their logo and uniforms.
 The Utah Jazz moved into the Delta Center (now Vivint Arena).

Standings

By division
Eastern Conference

Western Conference

By conference

Notes
z – Clinched home court advantage for the entire playoffs
c – Clinched home court advantage for the conference playoffs
y – Clinched division title 
x – Clinched playoff spot

Playoffs

Teams in bold advanced to the next round. The numbers to the left of each team indicate the team's seeding in its conference, and the numbers to the right indicate the number of games the team won in that round. The division champions are marked by an asterisk. Home court advantage does not necessarily belong to the higher-seeded team, but instead the team with the better regular season record; teams enjoying the home advantage are shown in italics.

Statistics leaders

NBA awards
Most Valuable Player: Michael Jordan, Chicago Bulls
Rookie of the Year: Larry Johnson, Charlotte Hornets
Defensive Player of the Year: David Robinson, San Antonio Spurs
Sixth Man of the Year: Detlef Schrempf, Indiana Pacers
Most Improved Player: Pervis Ellison, Washington Bullets
Coach of the Year: Don Nelson, Golden State Warriors

All-NBA First Team:
F – Karl Malone, Utah Jazz
F – Chris Mullin, Golden State Warriors
C – David Robinson, San Antonio Spurs
G – Michael Jordan, Chicago Bulls
G – Clyde Drexler, Portland Trail Blazers

All-NBA Second Team:
F – Scottie Pippen, Chicago Bulls
F – Charles Barkley, Philadelphia 76ers
C – Patrick Ewing, New York Knicks
G – Tim Hardaway, Golden State Warriors
G – John Stockton, Utah Jazz

All-NBA Third Team:
F – Dennis Rodman, Detroit Pistons
F – Kevin Willis, Atlanta Hawks
C – Brad Daugherty, Cleveland Cavaliers
G – Mark Price, Cleveland Cavaliers
G – Kevin Johnson, Phoenix Suns

NBA All-Rookie First Team:
Steve Smith, Miami Heat
Larry Johnson, Charlotte Hornets
Billy Owens, Golden State Warriors
Stacey Augmon, Atlanta Hawks
Dikembe Mutombo, Denver Nuggets

NBA All-Rookie Second Team:
Terrell Brandon, Cleveland Cavaliers
Rick Fox, Boston Celtics
Mark Macon, Denver Nuggets
Stanley Roberts, Orlando Magic
Larry Stewart, Washington Bullets

NBA All-Defensive First Team:
Dennis Rodman, Detroit Pistons
Scottie Pippen, Chicago Bulls
David Robinson, San Antonio Spurs
Michael Jordan, Chicago Bulls
Joe Dumars, Detroit Pistons

NBA All-Defensive Second Team:
Larry Nance, Cleveland Cavaliers
Buck Williams, Portland Trail Blazers
Patrick Ewing, New York Knicks
John Stockton, Utah Jazz
Micheal Williams, Indiana Pacers

References